Kangyidaunt is a town in the Ayeyarwady Region, Myanmar. It is the seat of the Kangyidaunt Township in the Pathein District.

References 

Populated places in Ayeyarwady Region
Township capitals of Myanmar